Athletics records progressions outline the lineage and improvement of the best ratified marks in a particular athletics event.

World records

Track events
50 metres (men) (women)
60 metres (men) (women)
100 metres (men) (women)
200 metres (men) (women)
400 metres (men) (women)
800 metres (men) (women)
1000 metres (men) (women)
1500 metres (men)  (women)
2000 metres (men) (women)
One mile (men) (women)
3000 metres (men) (women)
Two miles (men) (women)
5000 metres (men) (women)
10,000 metres (men) (women)
20,000 metres (men) (women)
One hour (men) (women)
50 metres hurdles (men) (women)
60 metres hurdles (men) (women)
80 metres hurdles — (women)
100 metres hurdles — (women)
110 metres hurdles (men) —
400 metres hurdles (men) (women)
3000 metres steeplechase (men) (women)
4×100 metres (men) (women)
4×400 metres (men) (women)

Field events
High jump (men) (men indoor) (women)
Long jump (men) (women)
Triple jump (men) (women)
Pole vault (men) (men indoor) (women)
Discus (men) (women)
Hammer (men) (women)
Javelin (men) (women)
Shot put (men) (women)
Pentathlon — (women) 
Heptathlon (men) (women) 
Decathlon (men) (women)

Road events
Half marathon (men) (women)
Marathon (men) (women)
100 kilometres (men) (women)
10 km walk (men) (women)
20 km walk (men) (women)
50 km walk (men) (women)

European records
Men's 100 metres European record progression
Men's 200 metres European record progression
Men's 400 metres European record progression
Men's 800 metres European record progression
Men's 1500 metres European record progression

See also

References

External links
IAAF Statistics Book 2009 – World record progressions (Men's from page 202–222, women's from page 292–309)
 Progression of IAAF World Records

 
Progressions
Masters athletics world record progressions
Indexes of sports topics